Máximo González was the defending champion, but he lost in the final 2–6, 5–7 against Carlos Berlocq.

Seeds

Draw

Finals

Top half

Bottom half

References
 Main Draw
 Qualifying Draw

2011 ATP Challenger Tour
2011 Singles
2011 in Uruguayan tennis